Ka Yee "Carrie" Wong Perrodo (born 1950/51) is a Hong Kong-born French billionaire heiress and businesswoman. She is the owner of the oil group Perenco, which was founded by her late husband Hubert.

Early life and career
Ka Yee "Carrie" Wong was born in Hong Kong and moved to Singapore to pursue a modelling career. Later she founded and sold a modeling agency, Carrie's Models, which is still active in Singapore.

Personal life
She was married to French businessman Hubert Perrodo (1944–2006), founder and sole owner of the Anglo-French oil and gas company Perenco. They had three children, François Hubert Marie Perrodo (born 14 February 1977), chairman of Perenco, Nathalie Perrodo-Samani (born 1980), and Bertrand Nicolas Hubert Perrodo (born 1984).

She lives in London, England.

References

1950s births
Living people
French businesspeople
French billionaires
Female billionaires
Hong Kong people
French people of Hong Kong descent
Year of birth missing (living people)
Hong Kong billionaires